The 2020 League1 Ontario season was supposed to be the sixth season of play for Women's Division of League1 Ontario, a Division 3 women's soccer league in the Canadian soccer pyramid and the highest level of soccer based in the Canadian province of Ontario.

On March 20, 2020, L1O postponed the start of the season due to the COVID-19 pandemic. On June 6, 2020, the league announced the cancellation of the "summer season" while also mentioning the possibility of returning in September 2020 for a shortened "fall season", though this was later ruled out.

Format 

For the regular season, each team would have played every other team once for a total of 12 matches. The playoff format would have included the top 8 teams, facing each other over 3 rounds, with the difference that the games will now be played over a single leg, instead of two. 

League1 Ontario and the Première Ligue de soccer du Québec had planned to hold a Final Four end-of-season tournament for the women's divisions, from August 14 to 16, pitting the top two sides from each league in an inter-provincial playoff. 

The L1O season was scheduled to start on April 25, and end with the Playoffs Final on August 8, with the L1O-PLSQ series scheduled for August 14 to 16.

Clubs
The women's division consists of 13 teams, an decrease from 14 teams in 2019. North Toronto Nitros added a women's team for the first time, while Ottawa South United moved to the PLSQ and DeRo United FC did not return.  Durham United FA re-branded as Pickering FC.

The following clubs were set to participate in the league prior to the season's cancellation.

Reserve Division
After introducing the Reserve Division during the 2019 men's season, it was set to be added to the women's division for the 2020 season. All of the clubs in L1O would be required to field a club in the division, while some other Ontario soccer clubs who did not have a team in the league were invited to field teams in the U21 Reserve division.

References

External links 

League1
League1 Ontario (women) seasons
League1